The Promise may refer to:

Film, television, and radio

Film
 The Promise (1917 film), a silent film starring Paul Willis
 The Promise (1969 film), a film starring Ian McKellen
 The Promise (1979 film), an American romantic drama film
 The Promise (1995 film), a film directed by Margarethe von Trotta
  (French, The Promise), a 1996 film by the Dardenne brothers
 The Promise (1999 film), a made-for-television film starring Tracy Nelson
 The Promise (2005 film), a Chinese fantasy film
 The Promise (2007 film), a Filipino version of Wuthering Heights
 The Promise (2008 film), an Egyptian film starring Asser Yassin
 The Promise (2016 film), a historical drama film about the Armenian Genocide, starring Oscar Isaac and Charlotte Le Bon
 The Promise (2017 film), a Thai horror film
 Killing for Love (film), also known as The Promise, a 2016 documentary about Jens Söring and Elizabeth Haysom

Television and radio 
 , also known as The Promise; a 2006 Indian soap opera
  (International broadcast title: The Promise), a Filipino primetime soap opera series
 The Promise (2011 TV serial), a UK series directed by Peter Kosminsky
 The Promise (2016 TV series), a Korean daily drama series aired by KBS
 "The Promise" (Arrow), an episode of Arrow
 "The Promise" (Cold Case), an episode of Cold Case
 "The Promise", a 1955 installment of the Hallmark Hall of Fame
 "The Promise" (The Larry Sanders Show), an episode of The Larry Sanders Show
 The Promise FM, the main network of Northern Christian Radio

Literature

Fiction 
 The Promise (Galgut novel), a 2021 novel by Damon Galgut
 The Promise (Kratochvil novel), a 2009 novel by Jiří Kratochvil
 The Promise (Potok novel), a 1969 novel by Chaim Potok
 Avatar: The Last Airbender – The Promise, a 2012 graphic novel by Gene Yang
 The Promise, a 1943 novel by Pearl S. Buck
 The Promise, a 1989 novel by Monica Hughes
 The Promise, a 1978 novel by Danielle Steel
 The Promise, a 2005 short-story collection by Ted Dekker

Nonfiction
 The Promise: God's Purpose and Plan for When Life Hurts, a 2008 book by Jonathan Morris
 The Promise: President Obama, Year One, a 2010 book by Jonathan Alter

Theatre 
 The Promise (musical), an annual outdoor passion play in Texas, US
 The Promise (1965 play), a play by Aleksei Nikolaevich Arbuzov
 The Promise (2010 play), a play by Ben Brown

Music

Bands 
 The Promise (American band), a hardcore punk band formerly signed to Deathwish Inc.

Albums 
 The Promise (Bif Naked album), 2009
 The Promise (Bruce Springsteen album), 2010 2-CD compilation album
 The Promise: The Darkness on the Edge of Town Story, 2010 3-CD, 3-DVD or Blu-ray box set by Bruce Springsteen
 The Promise (Deborah Cox album), 2008
 The Promise (Earth, Wind & Fire album), 2003
 The Promise (Fly to the Sky album), 2001
 The Promise (Freestyle Fellowship album), 2011
 The Promise (Il Divo album), 2008
 The Promise (John McLaughlin album), 1995
 The Promise (Mike Pinder album), 1976
 The Promise (Plus One album), 2000
 The Promise (T'Pau album), 1991
 The Promise (Vassilis Tsabropoulos album), 2008
 The Promise (Vaya Con Dios album), 2004
 The Promise, an album by David Hobson
 The Promise, a 2001 album by Forgotten Tales
 The Promise, a 1989 album by Kirk Whalum
The Promise, a 2010 album by Marc Roberts
 The Promise, a 1993 album by Ringworm
 The Promise: A Celebration of Christ's Birth, a 1991 album by Michael Card

Songs 
 "The Promise" (Arcadia song), 1986
 "The Promise" (Chris Cornell song), 2017
 "The Promise" (Girls Aloud song), 2008
 "The Promise" (In This Moment song), 2010
 "The Promise" (When in Rome song), 1988
 "The Promise", by Bruce Springsteen from 18 Tracks
 "The Promise", by Essence
 "The Promise", by Framing Hanley from A Promise to Burn
 "The Promise", by Holy Knights from A Gate Through the Past
 "The Promise", by Johnny Clegg from Heat, Dust and Dreams
 "The Promise", by Reks from The Greatest X
 "The Promise", by Tony Moran
 "The Promise", by Tracy Chapman from New Beginning
 "The Promise", by Within Temptation from Mother Earth
 "The Heart Asks Pleasure First/The Promise", by Michael Nyman for the soundtrack of the 1993 film The Piano

See also 
 A Promise (disambiguation)
 Promise (disambiguation)
 I Promise (disambiguation)
 Promises, Promises (disambiguation)